Sami Raatikainen is a Finnish guitarist who played for the German technical death metal band Necrophagist. He joined Necrophagist in 2006 after the departure of Christian Müenzner. He also plays guitar in the Finnish technical death metal band Codeon and performs guitar, bass, keyboard and drums for his solo project Radiance.

Radiance 
During Necrophagist's extended downtime Sami spent his time recording and producing a solo album called "The Burning Sun" under the project name Radiance. The entire album was written by Sami, including the vocals and lyrics, though Mats Levén recorded the vocals.

Sami also studies theoretical physics at the University of Helsinki in Finland as a PhD candidate with a master's degree.

Equipment 
Sami uses an Amfisound custom Routa model.  He uses ENGL SE's in Necrophagist due to Necrophagist endorsement deal with the company. He uses an ENGL Powerball in Codeon. 
Having recently become an Ibanez Guitars endorsee, Sami has started using an RG-Series 7 String on stage with Necrophagist.
His RG-7 is satin black, with a Lo-Pro Edge tremolo system and active EMG-707 pickups.
Sami is now using 7-string guitars on stage with Necrophagist in order to preview songs from their new album. He also purchased a custom neck-through RGD from Ibanez.

References

External links

Finnish heavy metal guitarists
Living people
Seven-string guitarists
Necrophagist members
Year of birth missing (living people)